The Yale Literary Magazine, founded in 1836, is the oldest student literary magazine in the United States and publishes poetry, fiction, and visual art by Yale undergraduates twice per academic year. Notable alumni featured in the magazine while students include Susan Choi, Sinclair Lewis, Meghan O'Rourke, ZZ Packer, Max Ritvo, Sarah Sze, and Thornton Wilder. The magazine's editor-in-chief is currently Bryce Morales. 

In 1936, the magazine published a centennial issue featuring several alumni authors, including Stephen Vincent Benét, William Lyon Phelps, and Gifford Pinchot. In 1978, the then-bankrupt magazine was purchased by alumnus Andrei Navrozov, but it was returned to student control in 1985 after Yale University won a lawsuit and ordered Navrozov to cease using the Yale name.

The magazine publishes one issue per semester, and awards the annual Francis Bergen Memorial prize to a student author. The spring 2020 issue was released online to accommodate the results of the coronavirus pandemic. In recent years, the magazine has conducted and published interviews with high-profile twentieth and twenty-first-century literary figures such as Junot Diaz, who won the Pulitzer Prize for Fiction, Art Spiegelman, who won a Pulitzer Prize for his graphic novel memoir Maus, and Paul Muldoon, the poetry editor for The New Yorker, who won a Pulitzer Prize for Poetry.

Editors
 Stephen Vincent Benét, circa 1820
 Albert Mathews (better known as Paul Siogvolk), circa 1842
 Homer Sprague, circa 1848

References

External links
 Opinion piece in the New York Times

Biannual magazines published in the United States
Poetry magazines published in the United States
Student magazines published in the United States
Magazines established in 1836
Magazines published in Connecticut
Mass media in New Haven, Connecticut
Yale University publications